Cape Gage is a rocky promontory forming the eastern extremity of James Ross Island and the west side of the north entrance to Admiralty Sound. It was discovered by a British expedition, 1839–43, under James Clark Ross, who named it for Vice Admiral William Hall Gage, a Lord Commissioner of the Admiralty.

References

Headlands of James Ross Island